John Coote Duggan (7 April 1918 – 20 July 2000) was the 11th Bishop of Tuam, Killala, and Achonry from 1970 to 1985.

Educated at The High School, Dublin and Trinity College, Dublin and ordained in 1942, his first post was a curacy at St Luke's, Cork. He was later the incumbent at Portarlington, then  St Paul's Glenageary, Dublin and finally (before his ordination to the episcopate) Archdeacon of Tuam.

References

1918 births
People educated at The High School, Dublin
Alumni of Trinity College Dublin
Anglican archdeacons in Ireland
20th-century Anglican bishops in Ireland
Bishops of Tuam, Killala, and Achonry
2000 deaths